Operation Old Bridge is the code name for the February 7, 2008 arrests in Italy and the United States that targeted the Gambino crime family; among the indicted were the reputed acting bosses Jackie D'Amico, Nicholas Corozzo and Joseph Corozzo. The indictments included murder, drug trafficking, robbery, and extortion.

Operation
The Federal Bureau of Investigation (FBI) was able to collect the needed information through informant Joseph Vollaro, (owner of a truck company on Staten Island) who secretly recorded several conversations with members of the Gambino family. More than 80 people were indicted in the Eastern District of New York.  The case is now referred to as United States of America v. Agate et al.  It was initially assigned to Judge Nicholas Garaufis, but later reassigned to Judge Jack B. Weinstein.

Gambino crime family boss Nicholas Corozzo turned fugitive after he was tipped off by his daughter who witnessed her husband and fellow mobster being led away by the US authorities. On May 29, 2008, Corozzo finally couldn't take life on the run anymore and so he turned himself in to authorities with his lawyer by his side. Of the 62 American defendants, 60 pleaded guilty with at least 52 of them facing no more than three years in prison.

The operation broke up a growing alliance between the Gambinos and the Sicilian Mafia, who wanted to get  further into the drug trade. One of those arrested in the raids in the US was Frank Cali, a captain in the Gambino family. He was allegedly the "ambassador" in the US for the Inzerillo crime family.

The name of the police operation, "Old Bridge", refers to the historical ties of an exile group of Sicilian Mafiosi across the Atlantic Ocean. After the Second Mafia War in the beginning of the 1980s the surviving members of the Inzerillo mafia family had been "allowed" to migrate to New York to avoid extermination by the Corleonesi faction and then victorious Sicilian boss of bosses Salvatore Riina. The Inzerillo's American relatives and associates of New York's Gambino family intervened on their behalf. They were allowed to settle in the States in exchange for a pledge: neither they nor their offspring would ever again set foot on Sicilian soil. They became known as gli Scappati, the Runaways. Two decades later, the Runaways were returning to Palermo. The exiles had good reasons: Riina and his successor Bernardo Provenzano were both arrested and are serving life terms in Italy. The runaway Inzerillo clan was allegedly rebuilding the "Old Bridge" between America and Sicily, reestablishing the business and drug trafficking ties between the Sicilian and American mobs.

Convictions
The following list contains some of the most notable charged and does not include most of those convicted.

Other indicted Mafiosi

American Mafiosi indicted
Those without a release date listed either weren't sentenced to jail time or weren't imprisoned in a Federal Bureau of Prisons.

Joseph Agate
Vincent "Elmo" Amarante
Jerome "Jerry" Brancato (released September 3, 2010)
Nicholas Calvo (released January 12, 2010)
Joseph "Joe Rackets" Casiere
Mario "Lanza" Cassarino (released September 15, 2010)
John Cavallo
Gino Cracolici
Sarah Dauria
Vincent "Vinny Hot" Decongilio (released January 22, 2010)
Salvatore DeGrazia
Vincent Donnis
Robert Francis "Bobby the Jew" Epifania (released June 6, 2010)
Cody Farrell
Louis Faustino
Russell "One Eye" Ferrisi (released December 5, 2008)
Louis Filippelli (released December 9, 2008)
Ronald Flam
Joseph "Joe Gag" Gaggi
Abid "Han" Ghani (released February 14, 2008)
Anthony "Buckwheat" Giammarino
Ernest "Ernie" Grillo (released April 13, 2010)
Christopher Howard
Steven Francis "Stevie I" Iaria (released March 31, 2009)
Eddie James
John Kasgorgis (released April 4, 2008)
William Kilgannon
Michael King
Anthony Licata (released February 1, 2011)
Joseph Marsilio
De facto Morganelli
Anthony O'Donnell
James Outerie (released June 25, 2010)
Vincent "Vinny Basile" Pacelli (released May 5, 2010)
John "Johnny Red Rose" Pisano (released September 30, 2008)
Todd Polakoff
Giulio "Gino" Pomponio
John "Reeg" Regis (released October 3, 2008)
Jerry Romano
Angelo "Little Ang" Ruggiero, Jr. (release date: May 2, 2013)
Steven Sabella
Jimmy Scalzo
Anthony John Scibelli (released January 26, 2011)
Augustus "Gus" Sclafani
Joseph Scopo (released July 27, 2010)
William "Billy" Scotto
Edward "Eddie" Sobol
Joseph Spinnato (released January 30, 2009)
Michael "Mike the Electrician" Urciuoli (released June 24, 2008)
Frank "Frankie" Vassallo
Tara "Big Tara" Vega
Arthur Zagari

Sicilian mafiosi indicted
 Francesco Adelfio (66)
 Salvatore Adelfio (42)
 Giuseppe Brunettini (37)
 Filippo Casamento (82) (Bocadifalco clan member, Bonanno family associate, former Catalano-Ganci Consortium member and Pizza Connection defendant) (released May 7, 2010)
 Antonino Chiappara (42)
 Sergio Corallo (42)
 Giovanni De Simone (46)
 Maurizio Di Fede (40)
 Salvatore Emanuele Di Maggio (59) (Torretta clan member)
 Nicola Di Salvo (70)
 Melchiorre Guglielmini (49)
 Giovanni Inzerillo (36) (son of Salvatore Inzerillo)
 Tommaso Lo Presti (33)
 Giovanni Lo Verde (69)
 Stefano Marino (36)
 Gianni Nicchi (27) (Pagliarelli capo-mafia, successor to Rotolo, Sicilian emissary to New York)
 Pietro Pipitone (54)
 Gaetano Savoca (41) (Brancaccio)
 Vincenzo Savoca (77) (Brancaccio)

Sicilian mafiosi already in prison who were indicted
 Andrea Adamo (46) (Brancaccio capo-mafia, ally of Salvatore Lo Piccolo)
 Calogero Di Gioia (60)
 Lorenzo Di Fede (83)
 Benedetto Graviano (50)
 Tommaso Inzerillo (59)
 Cesare Carmelo Lupo (47)
 Antonio Rotolo (62) (Pagliarelli capo-mafia, Palermo Federation leader, rival of Salvatore Lo Piccolo)
 Giuseppe "Pino" Savoca (74) (Brancaccio capo-mafia)
 Salvatore Sorrentino (43)

Sicilian mafiosi on the run
 Salvatore Parisi (54)

Sicilian mafiosi indicted who turned pentito
 Giovanni Adelfio (70) (Villagrazia clan member)

References

Further reading 
 De Risi, Giuliano. 79 Arresti Tra Sicilia e USA, Mafia, Stroncato L'Asse Palermo-New York, AGI News On. February 7, 2008.

Federal Bureau of Investigation operations
Gambino crime family
History of the Sicilian Mafia
American Mafia events
Operations against organized crime in the United States
Operations against organized crime in Italy